"All Girls Are the Same" (alternatively stylized in all caps) is the debut single by American rapper and singer Juice Wrld. It was officially released as the lead single from his debut studio album, Goodbye & Good Riddance on April 13, 2018, after its music video premiered in February. Produced by  Nick Mira, the song has amassed more than 1 billion streams on Spotify. This was his second song to achieve this, after "Lucid Dreams" reached the 1 billion stream milestone in December 2019. The song debuted at number 92 on the Billboard Hot 100 and peaked at number 41.

Composition 
The track centers around how women in Juice Wrld's past relationships have broken his heart with their lies and that he drinks hard liquor to cope with his sadness.

Music video 
The official music video was directed by Cole Bennett, and was released on February 25, 2018.

Remix 
The official remix of the song features American rapper Lil Yachty, who first previewed the collaboration on Instagram in late March 2018. Juice Wrld posted another snippet on Instagram on May 6. On June 25, 2018, when Lil Yachty uploaded the song on SoundCloud, it was immediately deleted due to copyright issues. However, fans managed to download the song before its removal, and it has since been available on YouTube.

Charts

Weekly charts

Year-end charts

Certifications

References

External links 
 

2018 debut singles
Interscope Records singles
Juice Wrld songs
2018 songs
Songs about heartache
Songs about alcohol
Songs written by Nick Mira
Songs written by Juice Wrld